Rhogogaster is a genus of sawflies in the family Tenthredinidae.

Species
 Rhogogaster californica (Norton, 1862) 
 Rhogogaster carpatica (Zhelochovtsev, 1988) 
 Rhogogaster chambersi Benson, 1947 
 Rhogogaster chlorosoma (Benson, 1943)
 Rhogogaster convergens Malaise, 1931
 Rhogogaster dryas (Benson, 1943) 
 Rhogogaster gayuboi Llorente, 1988 
 Rhogogaster genistae Benson, 1949 
 Rhogogaster kudiana Rohwer, 1925 
 Rhogogaster nigriventris Malaise, 1931 
 Rhogogaster nishijimai Togashi, 2001 
 Rhogogaster opacella Mocsary, 1909 
 Rhogogaster picta (Klug, 1814) 
 Rhogogaster punctulata (Klug, 1814) 
 Rhogogaster rishiriana Togashi, 2001 
 Rhogogaster shinoharai Togashi, 2001 
 Rhogogaster viridis (Linnaeus, 1758)

References
 Biolib
 Fauna Europaea
 Paleobiology Database

External links
 

Tenthredinidae
Taxa named by Friedrich Wilhelm Konow